This is a list of electors (members of the Electoral College) who cast ballots to elect the President of the United States and Vice President of the United States in the 1996 presidential election. There are 538 electors from the 50 states and the District of Columbia. While every state except Nebraska and Maine chooses the electors by statewide vote, many states require that one elector be designated for each congressional district. Except where otherwise noted, such designations refer to the elector's residence in that district rather than election by the voters of the district.

Alabama

All 9 of Alabama's electors voted for Bob Dole and Jack Kemp.
Bill Armistead
Pat Duncan
Glen Dunlap
Len Gavin
Henry King
Melba Peters
Don Sledge
Sam Steele
George G. Siebels Jr.

Alaska

All 3 of Alaska's electors voted for Dole and Kemp.
Joan B. Clutts
Alyce Hanley
Bob Ward

Arizona

All 8 of Arizona's electors voted for Bill Clinton and Al Gore.
Andrew S. Gordon
Rose Mofford
Scott Thomas Olson Sr.
Daniel R. Ortega Jr.
Jeanne P. Perpich
Mary V. Thomas
E. C. 'Polly' Rosenbaum
Thomas Bean

Arkansas

All 6 of Arkansas's electors voted for Clinton and Gore.
Deborah Lee
L. T. Walker
Mary Jean Benett
Maurice Mitchell
Ann Henry
Merle F. Peterson

California

All 54 of California's electors voted for Clinton and Gore.
Donald R. Alvarez
Dale K. Bankhead
Robert Batinovich
Beverly D. Braden
Carl Bryan
Lindsey D. Capps
Kathleen Clark
John M. Collins
Joshua L. Conaway
Jorge Covarrubias
Kim Carroll Cox
Theresa M. Duggan
Paul Eshoo
Timothy Farley
Carmen T. Garcia
Bob Glaser
Paul Goldenberg
Juana Gutierrez
Harold L. Halterman
Richard E. Holcomb
Stephen Kahn
Steven Kassel
Thomas J. Koch
Grace A. Koza
Hellen Lane
Francisco Leal
David C. Lizarraga
Ted Lumpkin
R. Keith McDonald
Paul F. Pelosi
Tom Pier
Sarah L. Reyes
Carol Shawn
Lane Sherman
Frances Skittone
Maureen Southwell
Jennifer A. Steen
Debra Stubblefield
John M. Taylor
Karen W. Titus
Jeffrey B. Towns
Lenore F. Wax
Jason Silva
Paul Barile
R. O. 'Bob' Davis
Richard L. Waldron
Guy C. Kimbrough
Sally J. Alexander
Tina L. Laine
Darity Wesley
John S. Laird
Nina Banuelos
Sandy Hester
Michael F. Bennet

Colorado

All 8 of Colorado's electors voted for Dole and Kemp.
Ron Buxman
Mason Carpenter
Carley Johnson
Barbara McTurk
Natalie Meyer
Don Bain
Shannon Robinson
Kendall Sansing

Connecticut

All 8 of Connecticut's electors voted for Clinton and Gore.
Frank L. Aieta
Dominic F. Balletto
Marjorie C. Bennett
Leo Canty
Fleeta Hudson
Hilda Santiago
Kenneth Slapin
John B. Larson

Delaware

All 3 of Delaware's electors voted for Clinton and Gore.
Gary E. Hindes
Catherine J. Mancini
Samuel E. Lathem

District of Columbia

All 3 of the District of Columbia's electors voted for Clinton and Gore.
Harry L. Thomas Sr.
Jeff Coudriet
Anne Westerfield Pitts

Florida

All 25 of Florida's electors voted for Clinton and Gore.
Joseph Chapman III
Charles William Nelson
Ron LaFace
Adele Graham
Cynthia Y. Hall
George H. Sheldon
Richard Swann
Skeets Friedkin
Scott R. Falmlen
Pattie Lanier
Buddy Mackay Jr.
Bob A. Butterworth
Rudolph Parker
Terrie W. Brady
Jon Ausman
Cathy Bartolotti
Mitchell W. Berger
George Comerford
Joyce M. Cusack
Nancy M. Dick
Juanita Geathers
Diane Glasser
Gloria G. Jackson
Katherine C. Kelly
Marilyn Lenard

Georgia

All 13 of Georgia's electors voted for Dole and Kemp.
Thomas J. Barnette
Dot Burns
Jeanne Ferst
Briggs A. Goggans
Camilla Moore
Brenda R. Lopez
Russell K. Paul
Oscar N. Persons
Alec Poitevint
John M. Stuckey Jr.
Stan Wise
Ray Wooldridge
Mack F. Mattingly

Hawaii

All 4 of Hawaii's electors voted for Clinton and Gore.
Marsha R. Joyner
Robert Bunda
Joy Kobashigawa Lewis
R. Carolyn Wilcox

Idaho

All 4 of Idaho's electors voted for Dole and Kemp.
Leora Day
Helen McKinney
Skip Smyser
John Sandy

Illinois

All 22 of Illinois's electors voted for Clinton and Gore.
Addie C. Wyatt
Donald Pedro
Neomi Hernandez
Joan Brennan
Eileen Jackson
James Sheehan
William Marovitz
Ruth Jackson
Carolyn B. Hodge
John Nelson
Joe McGlaughlin
Jerry Sinclair
Patrick Thompson
Daniel M. Pierce
Shirley McCombs
Rose Marie Lipinski
James A. DeLeo
Marge Friedman
Dave Bybee
Kathryn Harvey
Mary Lou Kearns
Gary J. LaPaille

Indiana

All 12 of Indiana's electors voted for Dole and Kemp.
Michael D. McDaniel
Barbara L. McClellan
Roger A. Chiabai
Virgil Scheidt
R. Wyatt Mick Jr.
Iris H. Clark
John R. Zentz
Robert L. Nelson
David C. Masten
Jim A. Kohlmeyer
Max A. Middendorf
John W. Sweezy

Iowa

All 7 of Iowa's electors voted for Clinton and Gore.
Karl J. Rhomberg
Paul Swenson
Versal Vanordstrand
Jim Carnahan
Steve Mandernach
Patsy Ramacitti
Rich Pope

Kansas

All 6 of Kansas's electors voted for Dole and Kemp.
Timothy Golba
Michael Harris
Betty Hanicke
Marynell Reece
Marjorie Robards
John Watkins

Kentucky

All 8 of Kentucky's electors voted for Clinton and Gore.
Rodney Casada
Bremer Ehrler, ex-Secretary of State (1988-1992)
Sandra Frank
June Lyne, former state representative
Don McMillan
Gwen Meehan
George M. Plummer
Eldon Renaud
Winnie Townsend

Louisiana

All 9 of Louisiana's electors voted for Clinton and Gore.
Ben L. Jeffers
Garland W. Webb
Stephanie R. Edwards
Henry A. Smith Jr.
Dorothy Huffman Wallace
Carla F. Chrisco
Bonnie P. Tynes
Mary Lou T. Winters
Mary E. Wisham

Maine

All 4 of Maine's electors voted for Clinton and Gore.
Sharon McIntyre
Samuel D. Shapiro
Burt Wartell
Joseph Mayo

Maryland

All 10 of Maryland's electors voted for Clinton and Gore.
Clarence W. Blount 
Louis L. Goldstein 
Harry R. Hughes 
Katherine M. Jones 
Dianne Madoni 
Shelley Morhaim 
Mary K. Prangley 
Saul Stern 
Irene C. Strieby 
Marvin F. Wilson

Massachusetts

All 12 of Massachusetts's electors voted for Clinton and Gore.
Barbara Travers
Mary K. O'Brien
Michael J. Whouley
Mark S. DiSalvo
John R. Doogan
Kevin A. Tarpley
William H. Bradley
Carol A. Donovan
Carol Ann Aloisi
Jovita Fontanez
Marc R. Pacheco
Mary J. Richards

Michigan

All 18 of Michigan's electors voted for Clinton and Gore.
Freman Hendrix
Rosemary DiPonio

Minnesota

All 10 of Minnesota's electors voted for Clinton and Gore.
Lance Peterson
Verna Lunz
Jackie Stevenson
Gladys Morton
Peggy Specktor
Opal Peterson
Lorraine Cecil
George Hunter
Marlene Kayser
John C. Massmann

Mississippi

All 7 of Mississippi's electors voted for Dole and Kemp.
Bob Anthony
J. L. Holloway
Larry Homan
Charles Irby
Robert Kane
John McCarty
Lois Robertson

Missouri

All 11 of Missouri's electors voted for Clinton and Gore.
Connie Johnson
Carole Gambino
Linda Schilly
Willard Reine
Virgil Troutwine
Bob Staton
Steve Stepp
Shirla Howard
H. E. 'Scat' Davis
Nancy Reynolds
Robert Wheeler

Montana

All 3 of Montana's electors voted for Dole and Kemp.
Ada Nash
Archie Lucht
Jack Galt

Nebraska

All 5 of Nebraska's electors voted for Dole and Kemp.
Hal Daub Jr.
Alice Dittman
Joyce Schram
Dawyn Otto
Charles Sigerson

Nevada

All 4 of Nevada's electors voted for Clinton and Gore.
Douglas Bache
Virginia Cain
Marie Ripps
Charles Waterman

New Hampshire

All 4 of New Hampshire's electors voted for Clinton and Gore.
Joseph F. Keefe
Jeanne Shaheen
Pat Russell
Edward E. Shumaker III

New Jersey

All 15 of New Jersey's electors voted for Clinton and Gore.
Reni Erdos
David Fernandez
Henry Gallo
Thomas S. Higgins
Lynne B. Hurwitz
Karen J. Kominsky
Jean A. Holtz
David S. Steiner
Philip Thigpen
Susan Wilson
Stephen S. Weinstein
Nicholas de B. Katzenbach
Zulima V. Farber
Thomas P. Giblin
Susan Bass Levin

New Mexico

All 5 of New Mexico's electors voted for Clinton and Gore.
Bruce King
Stephanie Gonzales
Manuel Sanchez
Fannie Atcitty
Sheryl Williams

New York

All 33 of New York's electors voted for Clinton and Gore.
Kathryn B. Mackey
Gerard J. Sweeney
Stanley Kalmon Schlein
Elizabeth Velez
Michael H. Reich
Ann M. Galante
Raymond B. Harding
Paul F. Cole
Frances L. Reiter
John Sullivan
G. Steven Pigeon
Victor A. Kovner
Edward F. Draves
Esther Kate Fiore
Denise W. King
Alberta M. Madonna
Mary C. Paladino
H. Carl McCall
Jeffrey C. Feldman
Michael J. Bragman
Thomas A. Fink
Deborah J. Glick
Denny Farrell
Sheldon Silver
Audrey I. Pheffer
Marcella Maxwell
Martin Connor
Inez E. Dickens
Judith H. Hope
Helen M. Marshall
Paula Redd Zeman
Leonard A. Weiss
Dominic J. Baranello

North Carolina

All 14 of North Carolina's electors voted for Dole and Kemp.
Howard B. Smith
Bettie West
J. D. Teachey
Nelson Dollar
Lee Q. McMillan
Carolyn McGee
Jim Cole
Tom Dwiggins
John Van Hanford
Gary Whitener
George Alexander Jones
Quentine Finch
Bill Graham
Dorothy Bursey

North Dakota

All 3 of North Dakota's electors voted for Dole and Kemp.
Vernon E. Wagner
Robert Peterson
Earl Strinden

Ohio

All 21 of Ohio's electors voted for Clinton and Gore.
Catherine Barrett
John C. Myers
Mary A. Briggs
John H. Schuler
Barbara K. Myers
David E. Giese
Cecilia Huffman
Nathaniel R. Hodoh
Dennis Lieberman
William Anthony Jr.
Frances Alberty
Socrates Space
Margaret Kearsey
William A. Burga
Timothy Barnhart
Enid Goubeaux
Dan Martin
Michael Morley
Regina Rollins
Jack Sizemore
William Sundermeyer

Oklahoma

All 8 of Oklahoma's electors voted for Dole and Kemp.
Gary W. Banz
J. Michael Brown
Dixie I. Galloway
Steven F. Garrett
Skip Healey
Leo F. Herlacher
Dale N. Switzer
Paul E. Thornbrugh

Oregon

All 7 of Oregon's electors voted for Clinton and Gore.
Jeannie Dodson-Edgars
John McFadden
Linda Johnson
J. Marc Abrams
Margaret Carter
Michael Graham
Valerie Payne

Pennsylvania

All 23 of Pennsylvania's electors voted for Clinton and Gore.
William Titelman
Robert A. Brady
Michael M. Dawida
Judy Lynch
Alba E. Martinez
Robert J. Mellow
Lazar M. Palnick
Tom Muphy
Leslie Reid Price
Anna Cibotti Verna
William M. George
John F. Street
Lisa M. Boscola
Sophie Masloff
Thomas A. Leonard
David J. Gondak
Valerie McDonald Roberts
Joanne Olszewski
Evelyn Rafalko-McNulty
Mark S. Singel
Marian B. Tasco
Ivan Itkin
Catherine Baker Knoll

Rhode Island

All 4 of Rhode Island's electors voted for Clinton and Gore.
Muriel A. Evans
Cristine McBurney
Joseph Muschiano
Robert Riesman

South Carolina

All 8 of South Carolina's electors voted for Dole and Kemp.
Elizabeth G. Cox
Thomas H. McLean
Lonnie Rowell
Michael F. Davis
Cynthia F. Costa
Daniel A. Richardson Sr.
Walter P. Witherspoon
Bob Taylor

South Dakota

All 3 of South Dakota's electors voted for Dole and Kemp.
Joel Rosenthal
Carole Boos
William J. Janklow

Tennessee

All 11 of Tennessee's electors voted for Clinton and Gore.
Jane G. Eskind
Gwen Fleming
Ned McWherter
Olan Mills II
William N. Morris
Harold G. Woods
Harlan Mathews
Dorothy Crook
M. Inez Crutchfield
Benjamin L. Hooks
Anna Belle O'Brien

Texas

All 32 of Texas's electors voted for Dole and Kemp.
Evelyn Collins
Joel Franke
Jean Bensmiller
Ben G. Raimer
David Thackston
Kay Copeland
Tonna Trumble
David Husband
M. A. Taylor
Nelda Eppes
Marian Faye Crossley
James Garvey
James E. Brandon
Doraline Daeley
Clint Inmon
Zeb D. Alford
Don Truman
Jonathan Gurwitz
Eric Thode
Michael Dugas
Leland Kirby
Melvin McCoy
Sarah McDougal
Charles D. Johnson
Melvin Cowart
Tina Hardcastle
Arthur Granado
Narciso V. Mendoza
Donna Peterson
Greg Davidson
Martin Daneman
Frank J. Corte Jr.

Utah

All 5 of Utah's electors voted for Dole and Kemp.
Joseph Cannon
Olene S. Walker
Arlene Ellis
Christopher B. Cannon
Michael O. Leavitt

Vermont

All 3 of Vermont's electors voted for Clinton and Gore.
Pat Barr
Michael J. Obuchowski
Carolyn Nissen

Virginia

All 13 of Virginia's electors voted for Dole and Kemp.
Hugh D. Key
Robert R. Fountain
Gary C. Byler
Mary A. Braswell
Patricia Strawn Bice
Michael W. D. Brown
Mark D. Franko
Frank O. Meeks
Ruth Aileen Hancock
Vincent A. DiBenedetto III
Elaine Nunez McConnell
Anne R. Keast
Marilyn L. Lussen

Washington

All 11 of Washington's electors voted for Clinton and Gore.
Nancy Rust
Leora Province
Mike Barr
Barbara McFarlin-Kosiec
Claude Brewer
Nancy Pease Hogan
Ray Naugle
Doreen Cato
Joe Nilsson
Jody Buckley
John Thompson

West Virginia

All 5 of West Virginia's electors voted for Clinton and Gore.
Barbara Evans Fleischauer
Daniel P. Lutz
Sarah Lee Neal
Rebecca I. White
Violet Midkiff

Wisconsin

All 11 of Wisconsin's electors voted for Clinton and Gore.
Karen Sostarich
Melissa Schroeder
Robert Friebert
Martha Love
Rosemarie McDowell
Mala McGhee
Sue Miller
Jeffrey Neubauer
Robert Schweder
Heidi Schwoch
Douglas Oitzinger

Wyoming

All 3 of Wyoming's electors voted for Dole and Kemp.
Becky Constantino
Lorraine Quarberg
Jim Geringer

References

United States presidential electors

1996